Franklandia triaristata, also known as lanoline bush, is a species of flowering plant in the protea family that is found in south-western Western Australia.

Description
The plant grows from a lignotuber as a shrub up to a metre in height. It has smooth, alternate leaves, 40–310 mm in length. The flowers are white to yellow, with purplish-brown markings, flowering from August to October.

Distribution and habitat
The species has a restricted range in south-western Western Australia, in the vicinity of the local government areas of Augusta, Margaret River, Busselton, Capel and Nannup, where it grows on white or grey sandy soils.

References

 

triaristata
Eudicots of Western Australia
Taxa named by George Bentham
Plants described in 1870